Ajit,  variously spelled Ajith, Agith, or Ajeet is a common male given name. It is used in its various forms throughout India and also in Nepal, Bangladesh and Sri Lanka. A related name is Ajay.

Etymology 
The name is derived from Sanskrit, where its primary meaning is "invincible", "irresistible", "unsurpassed". The literal meaning is "unconquered", from the prefix a- "not", and jita "conquered". It has variously been used to refer to a number of ideological figures, including Shiva and Vishnu in Hinduism, Maitreya in Buddhism and the second of the Arhats in Jainism among others.

People 
 Ajithkumar (born 1996),Tamilnadu 
 Ajit Agarkar (born 1977), Indian cricketer and commentator
 Ajit Andhare, Indian businessman
 Ajit Anjum (born 1969), Indian journalist and editor
 Ajeet Bajaj (born 1965), Indian adventurer
 Ajit Balakrishnan, Indian entrepreneur, business executive, and administrator
 Ajit Bandyopadhyay, Bengali actor and director
 Ajit Kumar Banerjee (1931–2014), Indian environmentalist
 Ajit Kumar Basu (1912–1986), Indian cardiac surgeon
 Ajit Bhandari (born 1994), Nepalese footballer
 Ajit Bharihoke, Indian judge
 Ajit Bhatia (born 1936), Indian cricketer
 Ajit Bhattacharjea (1924–2011), Indian journalist, newspaper editor, The Hindustan Times, The Times of India and The Indian Express
 Ajit Bhoite (born 1976), Indian cricketer
 Ajit Kumar Bhuyan (born 1952), Indian politician
 Ajit Chahal (born 1995), Indian cricketer
 Ajit Kumar Chakravarty (1886–1918), Bengali writer
 Ajit Chandila (born 1983), Indian cricketer
 Ajit Chandra Chatterjee (born 1923), Indian civil servant
 Ajit Kumar Chaturvedi, Indian professor and education administrator
 Ajit Das (1949–2020), Indian actor, director, and playwright
 Ajit Das Gupta (1924–2011), Indian cricketer
 Ajit Doval (born 1945), Indian politician
 Ajit Dutta (1907–1979), Bengali poet, writer, essayist, and professor
 Ajit George, Indian-American activist and game designer
 Ajit Kumar Guha (1914–1969), Bengali educationist
 Ajit Gulabchand (born 1948), Indian industrialist
 Ajit Gupta, Indian entrepreneur
 Ajit Narain Haksar (1925–2005), Indian businessman
 Ajit Hutheesing (1936–2017), Indian businessman
 Ajit Jain (born 1951), Indian-American businessman
 Ajit Jayaratne, Sinhalese businessman
 Ajit Jogi (1946–2020), Indian politician
 Ajit Johnson, Indian cancer geneticist
 Ajit Kadkade, Indian singer
 Ajit Kembhavi (born 1950), Indian astrophysicist
 Ajita Kesakambali, Indian philosopher
 Ajit Khan (1922–1998), screen name of Indian film actor Hamid Ali Khan
 Ajith Kumar (born 1971), Indian Tamil actor
 Ajit Lakra (born 1966), Indian field hockey player
 Ajit Kumar Maiti (born 1928), Indian neurophysiologist
 Ajit Manocha, Indian-American businessman
 Ajit Kumar Mehta (born 1932), Indian politician
 Ajit Merchant, Indian music composer and director
 Ajit Mohan (born 1974/1975), Indian businessman
 Ajit Narayanan (born 1981), Indian inventor
 Ajit Ninan (born 1955), Indian political cartoonist
 Ajit Kumar P, Indian Navy Admiral
 Ajit Pai (born 1973),  American attorney and former chairman of the Federal Communications Commission
 Ajit Pai (born 1945), Indian cricketer
 Ajit Kumar Panja (1936–2008), Indian politician
 Ajith C. S. Perera (born 1956), Sri Lankan disability activist, former cricket umpire
 Ajit Kumar Saha, Indian politician
 Ajeet Singh Kharkhari (born 1965), Indian politician of the Bharatiya Janata Party
 Ajit Singh (disambiguation), several people
 Ajit Kumar Singh (1962–2007), Indian politician
 Ajith Kumar Siriwardena, Sri Lankan Briton professor of hepato-pancreatico-biliary surgery 
 Ajit Iqbal Singh (born 1943), Indian mathematician
 Ajit Wadekar (born 1941), a former Indian cricketer and captain of the Indian national cricket tea

Fictional characters 
 Ajit Bandyopadhyay, fictional character in the detective series Byomkesh Bakshi

See also

References 

Indian masculine given names
Nepalese masculine given names